Petrognathini is a tribe of longhorn beetles of the subfamily Lamiinae. It was described by Blanchard in 1845.

Taxonomy
 Capitocrassus Van Eecke, 1921
 Falsimalmus Breuning, 1956
 Ioesse Thomson, 1864
 Ithocritus Lacordaire, 1872
 Lentalius Fairmaire, 1904
 Parajoesse Breuning, 1982
 Petrognatha Leach, 1819
 Pseudapriona Breuning, 1936
 Threnetica Thomson, 1868

References

 
Lamiinae